The State Symphony Capella of Russia (Государственная академическая симфоническая капелла России) comprises an orchestra and a choir, both based in Moscow, Russia.  Its principal conductor is Valery Polyansky.  It was formed in 1991 by merging the former USSR Ministry of Culture Symphony Orchestra (Симфонический оркестр Министерства культуры СССР) with the USSR State Chamber Choir (Государственный камерный хор СССР).  It is sometimes known as the Russian State Symphony Orchestra.

Principal Conductors
Valeri Polyansky (1992–present)
Gennady Rozhdestvensky (1981–1992) 
Maxim Shostakovich (1971–1981)
Yuri Ahronovich (1964–1971)
Samuil Samosud (1957–1964)

References

External links

 Article

Musical groups established in 1991
Russian symphony orchestras
1991 establishments in Russia